Masescha is a village of Liechtenstein, located in the municipality of Triesenberg.

References

Villages of Liechtenstein